Gary Schwertfeger (born July 24, 1940) was a Canadian football player who played for the BC Lions. He won the Grey Cup with them in 1964. He played college football at the University of Montana.

References

1940 births
Living people
Sportspeople from Milwaukee
Montana Grizzlies football players
Players of American football from Milwaukee
BC Lions players